Alexei Nikolaevich Kudashov (born July 21, 1971) is a Russian former professional ice hockey forward and current head coach for HC Dynamo Moscow of the Kontinental Hockey League (KHL).

Playing career
Kudashov was drafted by the Toronto Maple Leafs in 1991 and played 25 games for the Leafs during the 1993–94 NHL season. After spending parts of the next two seasons in the American Hockey League, Kudashov continued his career in Europe, primarily in the Russian Superleague and Kontinental Hockey League. He captained Dynamo Moscow to a Gagarin Cup championship in 2012, his last season as a professional player.

Career statistics

Regular season and playoffs

International

External links

1971 births
Living people
Ak Bars Kazan players
Carolina Monarchs players
Düsseldorfer EG players
Atlant Moscow Oblast players
HC CSKA Moscow players
HC Dynamo Moscow players
HC MVD players
Ice hockey players at the 1994 Winter Olympics
Kristall Elektrostal players
Krylya Sovetov Moscow players
Lokomotiv Yaroslavl players
Olympic ice hockey players of Russia
People from Elektrostal
Russia men's national ice hockey team coaches
Russian ice hockey centres
St. John's Maple Leafs players
Soviet ice hockey centres
Toronto Maple Leafs draft picks
Toronto Maple Leafs players
HC TPS players
Sportspeople from Moscow Oblast